Eurosport India (formerly known as DSport) is an Indian sports channel owned by Warner Bros. Discovery Asia-Pacific. It was launched as DSport in February 2017 with a partnership between Discovery India and Lex Sportel. In January 2020, Lex Sportel parted ways with Discovery, creating their own channel 1Sports. On 17 March 2020, Ministry of Information and Broadcasting permitted Discovery to rebrand the channel as Eurosport India.

History 
Launched as DSport in February 2017 by a partnership between Discovery India and Lex Sportel, due to low TRP channel was rebranded several times until 2020.

In January 2020, Lex Sportel (the content provider for Dsport) parted ways with Discovery, taking their event rights from this channel and created their own channel 1Sports. On 17 March 2020, Ministry of Information and Broadcasting permitted Discovery to finally rename the channel to Eurosport.

Programming

Cricket 
 Nepal T20 League

Football 
 I-league
 I-League 2nd Division
 Indian Women's League
 A-League
 Eredivisie
 J1 League
 Major League Soccer

Futsal 
 Futsal Club Championship

Basketball 
EuroLeague

Tennis 
 Davis Cup
 ATP World Tour 250
 ATP Cup
 Billie Jean King Cup

Golf 
 Asian Tour
 PGA Tour

Motorsport 
Deutsche Tourenwagen Masters
MotoGP

Cycling 
Tour de France
Giro d'Italia
Vuelta a España

Kickboxing
 GLORY SuperFight

MMA 
 Professional Fighters League

Pro-Wrestling
All Elite Wrestling
Impact Wrestling

References

External links

Eurosport
Warner Bros. Discovery Asia-Pacific
Sports television networks in India
English-language television stations in India
2017 establishments in Maharashtra
Television channels and stations established in 2017